Jan Stehlík (born 10 July 1986) is Czech former basketball player. In his career, Stehlík played for several clubs in the Czech Republic.

References

1986 births
Living people
Czech men's basketball players
People from Bílovec
Point guards
Shooting guards
BK NH Ostrava players
BC Nový Jičín players
Sportspeople from the Moravian-Silesian Region